Umberto Melnati (17 June 1897 – 30 March 1979) was an Italian film actor

He appeared in over 35 films between 1932 and 1962.

He starred in films such as the Mario Mattoli 1936 film L'uomo che sorride and Il signor Max (1937). He made many appearances alongside Vittorio De Sica when he was a younger actor.

Selected filmography
 Two Happy Hearts (1932)
 La segretaria per tutti (1933)
 The Song of the Sun (1934)
 Just Married (1934)
 But It's Nothing Serious (1936)
 The Countess of Parma (1936)
 L'uomo che sorride (1936)
 Il signor Max (1937)
 I Want to Live with Letizia (1938)
The House of Shame (1938)
 A Thousand Lire a Month (1939)
 Red Roses (1940)
 Two on a Vacation (1940)
 The Sinner (1940)
 Short Circuit (1943)
 Without a Woman (1943)
 Martin Toccaferro (1953)
 Woman of the Red Sea (1953)
 Flesh and the Woman (1954)
Appassionatamente (1954)
 Madame du Barry (1954)

References

External links
 

Italian male film actors
1897 births
1979 deaths
People from Livorno
20th-century Italian male actors